Laura Claridge (born 1952 in Clearwater, Florida) is an American author known primarily for her biographies of major 20th century figures, forcing re-examination of popular icons including Art Deco painter Tamara de Lempicka, Emily Post and Norman Rockwell.  Claridge was a tenured English professor at the United States Naval Academy until 1997.   She received an award from the National Endowment for the Humanities, and her 2008 biography of Emily Post received the J Anthony Lukas Award, administered by Harvard University's Neiman Foundation for Journalism and the Columbia University Graduate School of Journalism.  She has written for the Wall Street Journal, Boston Globe, Los Angeles Times, Vogue, and the Christian Science Monitor.  Claridge has appeared on the Today Show on NBC, CNN, BBC, CBS, NPR and ABC.

Claridge began her writing career as a British Romantic and feminist scholar.  With Elizabeth Langland, she edited Out of Bounds: Male Writers and Gender(ed) Criticism (1990).  In 1992 she wrote Romantic Potency: The Paradox of Desire. Tamara de Lempicka: A Life of Deco and Decadence was published in 1998, as well as the following year in the UK, Germany, Spain, and Poland. Norman Rockwell: A Life, the first critical biography of the popular American artist, appeared in the fall of 2001. Emily Post: Mistress of American Manners, Daughter of the Gilded Age was published in the fall of 2008.  Laura Claridge's biography of the pioneering publisher and co-founder of Knopf Publishing, Blanche Knopf, The Lady with the Borzoi was published by Farrar, Straus, and Giroux in April, 2016.   The TLS hailed it as "an impressive achievement." The Lady with the Borzoi was a New York Times Editor's Choice.

Laura Claridge lives in Saugerties, New York.

Bibliography

Books

 
 
 
''(Compilation edited by CSPAN's Brian Lamb. Contains "Laura Claridge on Norman Rockwell's Portraits of America" in addition to writers including Michael Moore, Maya Lin, Ann Coulter, Arthur Schlesinger Jr, Simon Winchester, Isaac Stern, Sandra Day O'Connor and others.)"
 
 
 
 
 co-editor, with Elizabeth Langland

External links 
Official website

1952 births
Living people
People from Clearwater, Florida
United States Naval Academy faculty
Writers from New York (state)
Writers from Florida
20th-century American women writers
21st-century American women writers
20th-century American biographers
American women biographers
21st-century American biographers